Florencio L. Vargas (November 7, 1931 – July 22, 2010) was a Filipino politician. A member of the Lakas-Kampi-CMD party, he has been elected to three terms as a Member of the House of Representatives of the Philippines, representing the 2nd District of Cagayan. He first won election to Congress in 2004, and was re-elected in 2007 and 2010. He died on July 22, 2010 due to leukemia.

Prior to his service in Congress, Vargas was elected governor of Cagayan from 1998 to 2001.

References

External links
 

1931 births
2010 deaths
Governors of Cagayan
Lakas–CMD politicians
Members of the House of Representatives of the Philippines from Cagayan
People from Cagayan
Deaths from leukemia